Nokia 2.1 is a Nokia-branded entry-level smartphone released by HMD Global in August 2018, running the Android operating system.

Design 
The phone has an aluminium frame with a plastic back. It runs on a Qualcomm Snapdragon 425 System-on-chip with 1 GB of RAM. It has Dual Sim support.

Reception 
The Nokia 2.1 received mixed reviews. Andrew Williams of TrustedReviews praised the phone’s "low price, large screen and stereo speakers" while criticising "poor storage and performance".

Reference List 

2.1
Mobile phones introduced in 2018
Discontinued smartphones